The Giffey senate is the current state government of Berlin, sworn in on 21 December 2021 after Franziska Giffey was elected as Governing Mayor of Berlin by the members of the Abgeordnetenhaus of Berlin. It is the 28th Senate of Berlin.

It was formed after the 2021 Berlin state election by the Social Democratic Party (SPD), Alliance 90/The Greens (GRÜNE), and The Left (LINKE). Excluding the Governing Mayor, the senate comprises ten ministers, called Senators. Three are members of the SPD, three are members of the Greens, three are members of the Left, and one is an independent politician (nominated by the SPD).

Formation 

The previous Senate was a coalition government of the SPD, Left, and Greens led by Governing Mayor Michael Müller of the SPD. He announced that he would not seek another term in the 2021 state election, and federal minister Franziska Giffey was chosen as the SPD's lead candidate.

The election took place on 26 September 2021, and resulted in no net change for the SPD, while the Greens improved from fourth to second place and the Left saw a minor decline. The SPD and Greens voiced their mutual desire to form a government together, and began to seek a third partner to reach a majority. Giffey favoured a coalition with the Free Democratic Party, while the Greens wanted to renew the outgoing government with The Left.

On 14 October, Giffey announced that the SPD and Greens would seek negotiations with The Left. After several weeks of discussions, the three parties presented their coalition agreement on 28 November. It was approved at an SPD congress on 5 December with 91.5% approval, followed by a Greens congress on 12 December where it was passed with 96.4% approval. The Left held a membership ballot to approve the coalition. The results were announced on 17 December, with 74.9% voting in favour.

The Abgeordnetenhaus elected Giffey as Governing Mayor on 21 December. She won 84 votes out of 139 cast, with 52 against, two abstentions, one invalid vote, and eight deputies absent.

Composition

References

External links

Cabinets of Berlin
State governments of Germany
Cabinets established in 2021
2021 establishments in Germany